Provincial assembly elections were held in Nepal on 26 November and 7 December 2017 along with the general election. 330 seats in the seven newly created provincial assemblies were elected by first-past-the-post voting and 220 by proportional representation. The election was part of Nepal's transformation to a federal republic. Next Election will be held in 2022 unless dissolved earlier without completing the five years term. 2022 Nepalese provincial election will be the second election for provinces after completion of tenure of five years.

Electoral system 
The 550 members of the provincial assemblies will be elected by two methods; 330 will be elected from single-member constituencies by first-past-the-post voting and 220 seats will be elected by closed list proportional representation for parties gathering more than 1.5% of the votes. Each voter will get separate ballot papers for the two methods.

Eligibility to vote 
To vote in the general election, one must be:
 on the electoral roll
 aged 18
 a citizen of Nepal
 of sound mind
 not ineligible as per federal election fraud and punishment laws

Timetable 
The key dates are listed below

The first phase of the election was carried out on 26 November 2017 in 32 mountainous and hilly districts. The counting of the votes of the first phase will also only begin once the second phase is conducted.

Results

Overall

Province 1

Province 2

Province 3

Province 4

Province 5

Province 6

Province 7

See also 
 2017 Nepalese general election
 2017 Nepalese local elections

References

Provincial
Provincial elections in Nepal
Nepal
Nepal
Election and referendum articles with incomplete results